Yang Da-il (Hangul: 양다일, born February 21, 1992), is a South Korean singer. He released his first EP, Say, on April 27, 2016.

Discography

Studio albums

Extended plays

Singles

Soundtrack appearances

Awards and nominations

Notes

References

1992 births
Living people
21st-century South Korean male  singers
Brand New Music artists